LH 54-425 is a spectroscopic binary star system in the LH 54 OB association within the Large Magellanic Cloud in the constellation Dorado.

Discovery and visibility
The OB association LH 54 was catalogued by astronomers Lucke and Hodge in 1970, listed as containing 18 member stars. It is associated with NGC 1955, part of the N51 HII region. The brightness and colour of LH 54-425 were measured in 1974. In 1996 M.S. Oey determined that LH 54-425 has an apparent (visual) magnitude of 13.13 and classified it as an O3-class giant.

A series of photometric and spectroscopic observations carried out by P. Ostrov between from 1998 to 2001 revealed that LH 54-425 varied very slightly with a regular period of 2.2475 days  due to distorted stars in a close binary system composed by an O3 class giant and an approximately O5 class companion.

System
The binary system has an orbital period of 2 days, 5 hours, and 56 minutes. The two stars are separated by only 15 times the width of the sun, or less than twice their own diameters. The more massive primary orbits at 200 km/s, while the secondary moves at 350 km/s, and the system as a whole is approaching us at around 300 km/s.

Properties
Both members of the LH 54-425 binary system are hot, massive, and luminous stars. The less massive secondary has an effective surface temperature of 41,000 K and the more massive primary is 45,000 K. The stars are 8 and 11 times the size of the sun, and the combination of high temperature and large size means the primary star is 500,000 times as luminous as the sun and the secondary 160,000 times as luminous. They are emitting a stellar wind with a velocity of 2,800 km/s.

Evolution
Stellar evolutionary models closely match the properties of the two stars at two million years old.  At this age, they have almost the same mass as when they first formed. Comparison between the models and observations suggest a small mass discrepancy, with the models predicting higher masses than those derived from the orbit. This is a long-standing and unsolved problem in the modelling of massive stars.

As the pair evolve, they may merge to form a single massive star. In time, the individual stars or the result of the merger will explode as a core-collapse supernova.

References

Stars in the Large Magellanic Cloud
Spectroscopic binaries
Dorado (constellation)
Large Magellanic Cloud
O-type main-sequence stars
Extragalactic stars